Four Two Ka One is a 2013 Bollywood comedy film directed by Anwer Khan and Ishwar Singh  The film stars Jimmy Shergill, Rajpal Yadav, Nikita Anand, Murli Sharma among many others. The film released on 10 May 2013. Four Two Ka One is  produced by Sunil Shah & Nillay Pande under the banner Bhumii Creations.

Plot
This comedy caper revolves around a mystery bag stolen by one of the characters in the film. And what follows is a laughter riot. The movie is directed by debutante Anwer Khan & Ishwar Singh and produced by Sunil Shah. Alog with Jimmy Shergil, Rajpal Yadav, Sushant Singh, Murli Sharma & former Miss India Nikita Anand will be seen in pivotal roles.

Cast
 Jimmy Shergill as Vijay Kumar
 Rajpal Yadav as Rajvir Sharma aka Raja
 Nikita Anand as Pooja Khanna
 Murli Sharma as Chawla
 Sushant Singh as ACP Sushant Singh
 Kurush Deboo as Mallu
 Shrikant Maski as Kallu
 Saurabh Dubey as K. K. Khanna, Pooja's father
 Mushtaq Khan as Taxi driver
 Dinesh Hingoo as Marwari Seth

Soundtrack

The album is composed by Avishek Majumder and J D Singh. The songs are written by Kumaar, Parwez Khan, Ashok Upadhyay and Anwer Khan. Musicperk.com rated the album 6/10 quoting "Have a selective approach and you are sure to enjoy".

References

External links
 
 
 

2013 films
Indian action comedy films
2010s Hindi-language films
2013 comedy films
Hindi-language comedy films